William Herbert "Mike" Massey (September 28, 1893 – October 10, 1971) was a Major League Baseball second baseman. He played the first half of the  season for the Boston Braves. He played ten seasons in the minor leagues, from  until .

Sources

Major League Baseball second basemen
Boston Braves players
Cleveland Spiders (minor league) players
Mobile Sea Gulls players
New Orleans Pelicans (baseball) players
Providence Grays (minor league) players
Shreveport Gassers players
Oklahoma City Indians players
Oakland Oaks (baseball) players
Chattanooga Lookouts players
Memphis Chickasaws players
Baseball players from Texas
Texas Longhorns baseball players
1893 births
1971 deaths